Mustapha Haida (born 12 October 1988) is a Moroccan-Italian Muay Thai kickboxer who competes in the middleweight and welterweight divisions. He fought for GLORY, SUPERKOMBAT,  Kunlun Fight, Bellator Kickboxing and currently fights in ONE Championship. 
 
He was ranked as a top ten Welterweight by Combat Press from May 2017, until September 2017.

Haida holds notable wins over fighters like Andy Souwer, Enriko Kehl, Dzianis Zuev or Abdallah Mabel.

Martial arts career
Haida fought for the WAKO Intercontinental title against Madické Kamara. He won the fight by a fifth round KO.

Mustapha unsuccessfully challenged for the ISKA Oriental Rules title held by Karim Ghajji, losing by a unanimous decision.

Haida fought in the Venum 72.5 kg Dragons Tournament. In the semifinals he scored a first round KO victory over Kader El Kaamouchi, and in the finals won a unanimous decision against Michael Krcmar.

He won the ISKA World Oriental Rules 72.5 kg title with a unanimous decision win over Johane Beausejour.

Haida participated in the Kunlun Fight 75 kg Contender Tournament, but lost in the semi finals to Miao Chenlei.

He was scheduled to challenge Regian Eersel for the ONE Lightweight Kickboxing title at ONE Championship: Fists Of Fury 3. Eersel won the fight by unanimous decision.

Haida faced Arian Sadikovic at ONE: Winter Warriors II on December 17, 2021. He lost the bout via unanimous decision.

Championships and accomplishments

Kickboxing 
World Association of Kickboxing Organizations
W.A.K.O Pro Intercontinental Championship (K-1 rules)
International Sport Karate Association
I.S.K.A World -72.5 kg Championship (Oriental Rules)

Professional kickboxing record 

|- style="background:#;"
| 2023-03-18 ||  ||align=left| Hanoun || Night Kick Out 8 || Lucca, Italy || ||  ||  
|- style="background:#cfc;"
| 2022-11-26 || Win ||align=left| Christian Guiderdone || Superfights Roma || Rome, Italy || Decision (Split) || 3 || 3:00 
|-
|-  style="background:#fbb;"
| 2021-12-17|| Loss ||align=left| Arian Sadikovic || ONE: Winter Warriors II || Kallang, Singapore || Decision (Unanimous) || 3 || 3:00
|-
|-  style="background:#fbb;"
| 2021-02-26|| Loss ||align=left| Regian Eersel || ONE Championship: Fists Of Fury 3 || Kallang, Singapore || Decision (Unanimous) || 5 || 3:00
|-
! style=background:white colspan=9 |
|-
|- style="background:#cfc;"
| 2019-05-25
| Win
| align="left" | Eder Lopes
| Oktagon
| Italy
| KO (Punches)
| 3
| 
|-
|- style="background:#fbb;"
|  2019-02-22 
| Loss
| align="left" | Nieky Holzken
|ONE Championship 91: Call to Greatness 
| Kallang, Singapore 
| Decision (Unanimous) 
| 3 
| 3:00
|- style="background:#cfc;"
| 2018-09-08
| Win
| align="left" | Daniel Dawson
| ONE Championship 79: Beyond The Horizon
| China
| KO (Straight Left)
| 3
| 2:14
|- style="background:#cfc;"
| 2017-04-08
| Win
| align="left" | Enriko Kehl
| Bellator Kickboxing 5
| Torino, Italy
| Decision (split)
| 3
| 3:00
|-
|- style="background:#fbb;"
| 2017-01-24
| Loss
| align="left" | Miao Chenlei
| Kung Fu World Championship – 75 kg Contender Sanda Tournament, Semi Finals
| Hunan, China
| Decision (unanimous)
| 3
| 3:00
|- style="background:#cfc;"
| 2016-10-30
| Win
| align="left" | Johane Beausejour
| Oktagon
| Florence, Italy
| Decision (Unanimous)
| 5
| 3:00
|-
! style=background:white colspan=9 |
|- style="background:#cfc;"
| 2016-09-17
| Win
| align="left" | Kike Bonnin
| Bellator Kickboxing 3
| Budapest, Hungary
| Ext. R. Decision (unanimous)
| 4
| 3:00
|- style="background:#fbb;"
| 2016-04-16
| Loss
| align="left" | Karim Ghajji
| Bellator Kickboxing 1
| Torino, Italy
| Decision (Split)
| 5
| 3:00
|- style="background:#cfc;"
| 2016-01-30
| Win
| align="left" | Wang Yuhu
| Thai Boxe Mania 2016
| Pattaya, Thailand
| Decision (unanimous)
| 3
| 3:00
|- style="background:#cfc;"
| 2015-11-28
| Win
| align="left" | Michael Krcmar
| Venum Victory World Series – 72.5 kg Dragons Tournament, Final
| Paris, France
| Decision (Unanimous)
| 3
| 3:00
|-
! style=background:white colspan=9 |
|- style="background:#cfc;"
| 2015-11-28
| Win
| align="left" | Kader El Kaamouchi
| Venum Victory World Series – 72.5 kg Dragons Tournament, Semi Final
| Paris, France
| KO
| 1
|
|- style="background:#cfc;"
| 2015-08-22
| Win
| align="left" | Abdallah Mabel
| Venum Victory World Series – 72,5 kg Tournament, Final
| Debrecen, Hungary
| Ext. R. Decision (majority)
| 4
| 3:00
|-
! style=background:white colspan=9 |
|- style="background:#cfc;"
| 2015-08-22
| Win
| align="left" | Benedek Zsolt
| Venum Victory World Series – 72,5 kg Tournament, Semi Final
| Debrecen, Hungary
| Decision (unanimous)
| 3
| 3:00
|- style="background:#cfc;"
| 2015-06-20
| Win
| align="left" | Eduard Bernadou
| Fight Night Valdarino VI
| Italy
| Decision (unanimous)
| 3
| 3:00
|- style="background:#cfc;"
| 2015-04-11
| Win
| align="left" | Pasquale Mangini
| Oktagon 2015: 20 Years Edition
| Milan, Italy
| Decision (unanimous)
| 3
| 3:00
|- style="background:#fbb;"
| 2015-03-17
| Loss
| align="left" | Chingiz Allazov
| Kunlun Fight 21 – World MAX 2015 Group H Tournament Semi Finals
| Sanya, China
| Decision (unanimous)
| 3
| 3:00
|- style="background:#cfc;"
| 2014-10-05
| Win
| align="left" | Dzianis Zuev
| Kunlun Fight 11 – World MAX Tournament 2015 Final 8
| Macao, China
| Decision (unanimous)
| 3
| 3:00
|-
! style=background:white colspan=9 |
|- style="background:#cfc;"
| 2014-07-27
| Win
| align="left" | Andy Souwer
| Kunlun Fight 7 – World MAX Tournament 2015 Final 16
| Zhoukou, China
| Ext. R. Decision (unanimous)
| 4
| 3:00
|-
! style=background:white colspan=9 |
|- style="background:#fbb;"
| 2014-05-30
| Loss
| align="left" | Karim Ghajji
| Final Fight I
| Le Havre, France
| Decision
| 5
| 3:00
|-
|-
! style=background:white colspan=9 |
|- style="background:#cfc;"
| 2013-11-03
| Win
| align="left" | Bogdan Stanciu
| SUPERKOMBAT New Heroes 6
| Italy
| KO
| 2
|
|- style="background:#fbb;"
| 2013-04-20
| Loss
| align="left" | Moses Saengtiennoi
| Oktagon 2013
| Milan, Italy
| TKO
| 2
|
|- style="background:#fbb;"
| 2012-11-03
| Loss
| align="left" | Jordan Watson
| Glory 3: Rome
| Milan, Italy
| Decision (unanimous)
| 3
| 3:00
|- style="background:#cfc;"
| 2012-06-09
| Win
| align="left" | Madické Kamara
| Fight Night Valdarno	
| Italy
| KO 
| 5
|-
! style=background:white colspan=9 |
|- style="background:#cfc;"
| 2012-05-05
| Win
| align="left" | Sharos Huyer	
| D-Fight
| Italy
| KO 
|
|- style="background:#cfc;"
| 2012-03-24
| Win
| align="left" | Hunkar Kilic
| Oktagon 2012
| Milan, Italy
| Decision (unanimous)
| 3
| 3:00
|- style="background:#cfc;"
| 2012-02-04
| Win
| align="left" | Marco Re
| Thai Boxe Mania 2012
| Turin, Italy
| Decision (unanimous)
| 3
| 3:00
|- style="background:#fbb;"
| 2011-02-06
| Win
| align="left" | Arnaldo Silva
| Night Kick Out V
| Turin, Italy
| Decision (unanimous)
| 3
| 3:00
|- style="background:#c5d2ea;"
| 2010-07-23
| Draw
| align="left" | Wald Haddad
| Le Choc Des Gladiateurs IX	
| France
| Decision 
| 3
| 3:00
|-
| colspan=9 | Legend:

See also
 List of male kickboxers

References

External links 
 Record at muaythaitv.com

1988 births
Living people
Moroccan male kickboxers
Italian male kickboxers
Middleweight kickboxers
Welterweight kickboxers
Moroccan Muay Thai practitioners
Italian Muay Thai practitioners
Moroccan emigrants to Italy
Italian sportspeople of African descent
Glory kickboxers
Kunlun Fight kickboxers
SUPERKOMBAT kickboxers
ONE Championship kickboxers